Chien Joanna Lei (born 28 November 1958) is a Taiwanese politician.

Early life
Joanna Lei studied at National Taiwan University before earning a master's degree and doctorate from Annenberg School for Communication, University of Pennsylvania in the United States.

Political career
Lei, a member of the New Party, was co-nominated by the Kuomintang in the 2004 legislative elections, and won. As a legislator, Lei took an interest in domestic labor and migrant workers. She lost an October 2007 Kuomintang primary, and formally left the party in November. Lei was named a New Party candidate, and lost reelection.

Later career
After stepping down from the Legislative Yuan, Lei became the chair of Kinmen Kaoliang Liquor. She launched an unsuccessful independent bid for the legislature in 2012. In 2015, Lei co-founded the Faith And Hope League, and declared opposition to same-sex marriage in Taiwan. Lei has organized petitions to consider the issue of "family protection" via referendum, while opposing the use of referendums to determine support for same-sex marriage. She stated in 2017 that same-sex marriage would "destroy marriage as we know it. Some places are waiting for Taiwan to set the example. If Taiwan falls, then the rest of Asia will fall." In December 2017, Lei succeeded  as chair of the National Women's League.

References

1958 births
Living people
New Taipei Members of the Legislative Yuan
Members of the 6th Legislative Yuan
21st-century Taiwanese women politicians
New Party Members of the Legislative Yuan
Kuomintang Members of the Legislative Yuan in Taiwan
National Taiwan University alumni
University of Pennsylvania alumni
Taiwanese political party founders